Peter McNamara and Paul McNamee were the defending champions, but McNamara did not compete. McNamee played with Brian Gottfried but lost in the quarterfinals to Anders Järryd and Hans Simonsson.

Peter Fleming and John McEnroe defeated Tim and Tom Gullikson in the final, 6–4, 6–3, 6–4 to win the gentlemen's doubles title at the 1983 Wimbledon Championships.

Seeds

  Peter Fleming /  John McEnroe (champions)
  Kevin Curren /  Steve Denton (semifinals)
  Brian Gottfried /  Paul McNamee (quarterfinals)
  Mark Edmondson /  Sherwood Stewart (first round)
 n/a
  Anders Järryd /  Hans Simonsson (semifinals)
  Tim Gullikson /  Tom Gullikson (final)
  Fritz Buehning /  Brian Teacher (third round)
  Victor Amaya /  Hank Pfister (first round)
  John Alexander /  John Fitzgerald (quarterfinals)
  Sandy Mayer /  Ferdi Taygan (third round)
  Broderick Dyke /  Rod Frawley (first round)
  Andy Andrews /  John Sadri (first round)
  Chip Hooper /  Peter Rennert (first round)
  Tracy Delatte /  Johan Kriek (first round)
  Jan Gunnarsson /  Mike Leach (first round)

Draw

Finals

Top half

Section 1

Section 2

Bottom half

Section 3

Section 4

References

External links

1983 Wimbledon Championships – Men's draws and results at the International Tennis Federation

Men's Doubles
Wimbledon Championship by year – Men's doubles